Gilbert William Hutchins (28 February 1858 – 25 November 1902) was an English first-class cricketer active 1890 who played for Middlesex. He was born in Knebworth; died in Bedford.

References

1858 births
1902 deaths
English cricketers
Middlesex cricketers